Louis Agyemang (born 4 April 1983) is a Ghanaian former professional footballer who played as a striker. He is one of the few to have played for Asante Kotoko S.C. and arch rivals Accra Hearts of Oak S.C. subsequently playing for Étoile Sportive du Sahel, Kaizer Chiefs F.C.

Club career
Agyemang was born in Accra.

His previous club was when he was on loan at Dynamos in the South African National First Division, on 5 December 2008 he returned to Asante Kotoko. After two years with Asante Kotoko signed on 20 December 2010 with Medeama S.C.

International career
Agyemang was part of the Ghana national team at the 2006 African Nations Cup in Egypt.

References

External links

Living people
1983 births
Footballers from Accra
Association football forwards
Ghanaian footballers
Ghana international footballers
2006 Africa Cup of Nations players
Accra Hearts of Oak S.C. players
Kaizer Chiefs F.C. players
Étoile Sportive du Sahel players
Dynamos F.C. (South Africa) players
Medeama SC players
Ashanti Gold SC players
Ghanaian expatriate footballers
Expatriate soccer players in South Africa
Expatriate footballers in Tunisia